Judith Corominas is a Spanish former international football defender who played for FC Barcelona.

International career
García was also part of the Spanish team at the 1997 European Championships that reached the semi finals.

Honours

Barcelona

Copa de la Reina: 1994

References

External links

1966 births
People from the Province of Girona
Spain women's international footballers
Primera División (women) players
Women's association football defenders
Spanish women's footballers
FC Barcelona Femení players
UE L'Estartit players
Living people